Charles Thomas, 3rd Prince of Löwenstein-Wertheim-Rochefort (7 March 1714 – 6 June 1789) was from 1735 to 1789 the third Prince of Löwenstein-Wertheim-Rochefort.

Family 
Charles Thomas was the eldest son and second children of Dominic Marquard, 2nd Prince of Löwenstein-Wertheim-Rochefort (1690–1735) and his wife Christine Franziska Polyxena (1688-1728) a daughter of Charles, Landgrave of Hesse-Wanfried by his second wife Countess Juliane Alexandrine of Leiningen-Dagsburg.

On 7 July 1736 in Vienna he married Princess Maria Charlotte of Holstein-Wiesenburg (1718–1765). Their only child and daughter Leopoldine (1739 - 1765) married in 1761 her cousin, Charles Albert II, Prince of Hohenlohe-Waldenburg-Schillingsfürst (1742-1796). After the death of his first wife, he married morganatically on 4 February 1770 Maria Josepha von Stipplin (1735-1799). This marriage was without issue.

Study 
Charles Thomas studied in Prague and in Paris. From 1735 he was a corresponding member of the Académie française and during his life he hold a large library.

Military career

On 4 May 1758 he was made a Palatine Lieutenant General and on 31 December 1769 imperial Lieutenant Fieldmarshal.

Reign

Successor 
After more than fifty years as reigning prince and without legitimate male heirs, Charles Thomas was succeeded after his death by his nephew, Dominic Constantine (1762-1814), son of his youngest brother Prince Theodor Alexander of Löwenstein-Wertheim-Rochefort (1722-1780).

Footnotes

Bibliography 
 Harald Stockert: Adel im Übergang. Die Fürsten und Grafen von Löwenstein-Wertheim zwischen Landesherrschaft und Standesherrschaft 1780-1850, Kohlhammer Verlag, Stuttgart 2000, 
 Christian Schreck: Hofstaat und Verwaltung der Fürsten von Löwenstein-Wertheim-Rochefort im 18. Jahrhundert. Leidorf, Rahden/Westfalen, 2006

Charles Thomas
1714 births
1789 deaths
18th-century German people
Members of the Académie Française
Generals of the Holy Roman Empire